Troy Cassar-Daley Live is the first live album by Australian country musician Troy Cassar-Daley. The album was recorded at The York Theatre, Sydney on 23 June 2010, during Cassar-Daley's "I Love This Place Tour". The album was released as a 2xCD and DVD on 22 October 2010. 

At the ARIA Music Awards of 2011, the album was nominated for ARIA Award for Best Country Album.

Track listing

Charts

Certifications

Release history

References

2010 live albums
Troy Cassar-Daley albums
Live albums by Australian artists
Liberation Records  albums